This is a list of Hindu temples in the United Kingdom, sorted by constituent country and then by region.

England

-See also: All Hindu Temples in United-Kingdom, their contact details and opening hours

East of England

Luton
BAPS Shri Swaminarayan Mandir, Luton
Geeta Ashram
Shree Sanatan Seva Samaj Hindu Community Centre

Cambridgeshire

Shri Ram Mandir - Peterborough
Rama Mandir, Peterborough, Cambridgeshire

Bedfordshire 
 Bedford Hindu Temple

Essex
BAPS Shri Swaminarayan Mandir, Southend-On-Sea

Hertfordshire
Bhaktivedanta Manor, Aldenham (near Watford), 
 U.K. Nagara Shiva Temple, Watford

East Midlands

Derbyshire
Hindu Temple Geeta Bhawan, Derby

Loughborough
BAPS Shri Swaminarayan Mandir, Loughborough
Geeta Bhawan, Loughborough
Shree Ram Krishna Centre

Leicester
 Shri saibaba temple 
BAPS Shri Swaminarayan Mandir, Leicester 
Geeta Bhavan, Leicester
Haveli Shriji Dwar
Hare Krishna Mandir (ISKCON)
Hindu Temple & Community Centre
Jalarama Pratharna Mandal 
Leicestershire Brahma Sama
Leicester Sri Murugan Temple 
Mandir Baba Balak Nath
Ram Mandir 
Sanatan Mandir 
Shree Hindu Mandir
Shree Ram Mandir
Maher samaj centre 
Shree Prajapati Community Centre (Leicester Branch)
Shree Jalaram Mandir (or Shree Jalaram Prarthana Mandal)
Shri Gita Bhawan
Shakti Mandir
Sri Jeya Durga Temple
Swaminarayana Temple (ISSO)
Wanza Community Centre
ISKCON Leicester
Gayatri Chetna Kendrag

Nottingham
BAPS Shri Swaminarayan Mandir
Bhagwati Shakti Peeth, Basford 
Hindu Temple, Carlton 
ISKCON at Queens Walk Community Centre
Sai Dham, Basford 
Sri Thurkkai Amman Temple

Wellingborough
BAPS Shri Swaminarayan Mandir, Wellingborough 
Wellingborough District Hindu Association

Greater London

Inner boroughs (London postal districts)

E
Dharma Mandir, Enfield 
Shree Sanatan Dharm Mandal Durga Mandir (Durga Mandir), Ilford 
Sri Mahalakshmi Temple, East Ham 
Kutch Satsang Swaminarayana Temple, Forest Gate
London Sri Murugan Temple, Manor Park 
Radha Krishna Temple, Stratford
Swaminarayana Hindu Mission, Upton
Sri Karpaga Vinayagar Temple, Walthamstow
Sri Marupuram Maha Pathrakali Amman Kovil, Walthamstow
Shiridi Saibaba Temple, East Ham

N
Hindu Centre, Belsize Park
Krishna Yoga Mandir, Edmonton
Nagapooshani Ambaal, Enfield

NW

Shree Swaminarayan Mandir, Kingsbury 
Holy Mission of Guru Nanak (Sindhi Community House), Cricklewood 
Hindu Cultural Society, North Finchley, Finchley
Hindu Temple, Finchley
Gayatri Temple, West Hendon, Hendon
Highgate Hill Murugan Temple, Highgate Hill  
Swaminarayan Temple, Willesden 
BAPS Shri Swaminarayan Mandir London

SE
*Shri Kasi Viswanathar Temple UK, Swanley
*London Sivan Kovil (Shiva Temple), Lewisham
South East Hindu Association, Woolwich
Greenwich Hindu Mandir, Plumstead
*Shree Sanatan Mandir, Crawley, SE
Kutch Satsang Swaminarayana Temple, Plumstead
Maha Lakshmi Vidya Temple, Forest Hill
Shri Vel Murugan Alayam, Catford

SW
ISKCON South London Temple (South Norwood) 
Caribbean Hindu Cultral Society - Brixton Hill
Radha Krishna Temple, Balham
International Swaminarayana Satsang Organisation, Streatham
Hindu Society, Tooting
Muththumari Amman Temple, Tooting
Ganapathy Temple, Wimbledon 
Caribbean Hindu Cultral Society - Brixton Hill

W
Shri Kanaga Thurkkai Amman Temple, West Ealing, Ealing 
London Sevashrama Sangh, Shepherds Bush
Radha Krishna Temple (ISKCON), Soho, Westminster

Outer boroughs

East
Shrinathji Sanatan Hindu Mandir, Leytonstone
Radha Krishna Temple (ISKCON), Redbridge 
Shree Sanatan Dharm Mandal (Durga Mandir), 
Vishwa Hindu Prashad temple and Ilford Hindu Centre, Ilford 
Sri Selva Vinayagar Temple, Ilford

Harrow

International Siddhashram Shakti Centre, Harrow 
London Sree Ayyappan Temple UK, Harrow 
Kutch Satsang Swaminarayana Temple, Harrow
Dharma Bhakti Manor, Stanmore 
Shri Sithi Vinayagar Thevasthanam, Harrow
Hindu Swaminarayan Temple & Cultural Centre (Yogi Divine Society), Harrow

South
Raja Rajeswary Amman Temple, Stoneleigh
New Malden Murugan Temple, New Malden

Wembley

Eelapatheeswarar Aalayam
London Nadarajar Temple
Shakti Mandir 
Shree Govardhan Nathji Haveli (Jalaram Jyot Trust)
Shree Sanatan Hindu Mandir (Vallabh Nidhi) 
Shirdi Sai Baba Temple Association of London

West
Adhya Shakthi Mataji Temple, Cowley 
Jalaram Mandir, Greenford 
Jalaram Jupadi, Hounslow 
Kali Mata Mandir, Hayes 
Laxmi Narayan Mandir, Hounslow 
Shree Ram Mandir, Southhall 
Vishwa Hindu Mandir, Southall

North East

Middlesbrough
Radha Krishna Temple, Middlesbrough

Newcastle upon Tyne 
Hindu Temple, Newcastle 
ISKCON Newcastle

-See also: All Hindu Temples in Newcastle, their contact details and opening hours

North West

Ashton-under-Lyne
BAPS Shri Swaminarayan Mandir, Ashton-Under-Lyne 
Rama Temple
Shree Ambaji Mandir, Shree Bharatiya Mandal

Bolton
BAPS Shri Swaminarayan Centre, Bolton
Krishna Mandir, Bolton
Ramkrishna Viveknanda Centre, Bolton
Shree Kutch Satsang Swaminarayana Temple, Bolton
Shree Swaminarayan Mandir Bolton 
Veda Mandir, Bolton
-See also: All Hindu Temples in Bolton, their contact details and opening hours

Merseyside
Liverpool Ganesh Temple, Kirkby, Liverpool )( liverpoolganeshtemple.org.uk )
Radha Krishna Temple, Liverpool
Rama Krishna Temple, Warrington
Liverpool Murugan Temple, Upton, Wirral (liverpoolmurugantemple.org.uk)
-See also: All Hindu Temples in Liverpool, their contact details and opening hours

Manchester
Geeta Bhavan Mandir, Manchester 
Hare Krishna Centre (ISKCON), Manchester
Radha Krishna Mandir, Manchester 
See also: All Hindu Temples in Manchester, their contact details and opening hours

Oldham
Shree Radha Krishna Temple (Indian Association), 
Shree Swaminarayan Mandir

Preston
BAPS Shri Swaminarayan Hindu Mandir, Preston 
Gujarat Hindu Society, Preston 
Telugu Community Association, Preston 
-See also: All Hindu Temples in Preston, their contact details and opening hours

South East

East Sussex
Shree Swaminarayan Mandir (ISSO), Brighton

Berkshire
Reading Hindu Temple, Reading
Shirdi Sai Baba Temple & Community Centre, Reading
Hindu Temple, Slough

Buckinghamshire
Ramakrishna Vedanta Centre, Bourne End 
Anoopam Mission, Denham (near Uxbridge)
Aylesbury Hindu Temple, Aylesbury 
Uchi Murugan Koyil, Bridge Street, High Wycombe [www.uchimurugankoyil.com]

Kent
Shri Kasi Viswanathar Temple, Swanley 
Hindu Temple, Medway
Hindu Temple, Gravesend

Hampshire
Hindu Temple, Southampton, Hampshire 
BAPS Shri Swaminarayan Mandir, Havant

Oxfordshire
Guru Kripa, The Old Rectory, Middleton Stoney, Oxon

West Sussex
Sanatan Mandir(GHU), Crawley 
Sri Swarna Kamadchy Amman 
Shree Swaminarayan Mandir (ISSO)

South West
Gloucester Hindu Temple, Gloucester
Hindu Temple, Bristol 
Krishna Mandir, Cheltenham, Gloucestershire
Exeter Hindu Cultural Centre, Exeter

West Midlands

Birmingham
BAPS Shri Swaminarayan Mandir, Birmingham 
Shree Geeta Bhawan 
ISKCON Birmingham 
Birmingham Pragati Mandal (or Shree Krishna Temple) 
Shree Laxmi Narayan Mandir 
Shree Ram Mandir

Coventry
Coventry Shri Sidhi Vinayagar Devasthanam, Coventry 
Coventry Eellakkanthan Thirukkovil, (Murugan temple) Coventry 
BAPS Shri Swaminarayan Centre, Coventry
Baba Balak Nathji Mandir
Hindu Temple Society
Murugan Temple, coventry 
Krishna Mandir
Radha Krishna Cultural Centre
Sanatan Dharm Hindu Temple
ISKCON Coventry
Shree Mahanand Dham  
-See also: All Hindu Temples in Birmingham, their contact details and opening hours

Dudley
Shree Krishna Mandir
Mata Da Mandir
-See also: All Hindu Temples in Dudley, their contact details and opening hours

Sandwell
Temple Baba Balak Nath, West Bromwich
Durga Bhawan, Smethwick 
Shree Krishna Mandir, West Bromwich
Sri Venkateswara (Balaji) Temple

Shropshire
Shri Radha Krishna Temple (Hindu Cultural Resource Centre Telford)

Walsall
Mandir Baba Balak Nath, Walsall
Shree Ram Mandir, Walsall
Hindu Samaj Mandal, Darlaston
Maha Shiv Shakti Mandir, Willenhall

Warwickshire
Hindu Gujarati Samaj, Nuneaton 
Kalyan Mandal, Rugby
Krishna Mandir, Leamington Spa

Wolverhampton
Durga Bhawan, Bilston 
Shree Krishna Mandir, Wolverhampton
Gujarati Association, Wolverhampton 
Rama Krishna Temple, Bilston
Maa Bhameshwari Kali Mandir, Willenhall
Universal Divine Temple Ek Nivas, Wolverhampton

Yorkshire and the Humber

Bradford
Bradford Lakshmi Narayan Hindu Temple
Hindu Temple & Community Centre
Jalarama Shakti Mandal
Leuva Patidar Samaj
Shree Prajapati Hindu Temple & Community Centre

Huddersfield
Sita Rama Temple, Huddersfield
Hindu Temple, Zetland Street, Huddersfield

Leeds
Leeds Hindu Mandir 
Leeds Hindu Mandir Community Hall

Sheffield
Hindu Samaj, Sheffield

Northern Ireland
Govindadwipa (ISKCON), Derrylin
Laxmi Narayana Mandir, Belfast
Radha–Madhava Mandir, Belfast

Scotland
Hindu Temple & Cultural Centre, Edinburgh 
Sundara Ganapathy Temple, Glasgow 
Hindu Temple, Glasgow
Karuna Bhavan - International society of Krishna Consciousness (ISKCON), Lesmahagow
Tayside Hindu Cultural & Community Centre, Dundee
Aberdeen Hindu Temple, Aberdeen.

Wales

Cardiff
Bhaktidham Wales, Cardiff Bhaktidham Wales, Cardiff
HCA India Centre Temple, Cardiff
Sanatan Dharma Mandal, Cardiff
Shree Swaminarayan Temple

Carmarthen
Skanda Vale, Carmarthenshire

Port Talbot
Wales Hanuman Temple-Sri Thanthoondri Anjaneyar Sithapeedam, Port Talbot SA13 1YR
Sri Kalpaga Vinayagar Temple, Port Talbot 
Facebook Wales-Sri-Kalpaga-Vinayakar-Temple
Shri Kalpaga Hindu Cultural Association - in  SA12 6HZ

Swansea
Radha Krishna Temple (Govinda's), Swansea
Tridev Temple, Meditation and Spiritual Awareness Society, Swansea

Overseas Territories
Gibraltar Hindu Temple

See also 
 Lists of Hindu temples by country
In 2020, Historic England (HE) published A Survey of Hindu Buildings in England with the aim of providing information about buildings that Hindus use in England so that HE can work with communities to enhance and protect those buildings now and in the future. The scoping survey identified 187 Hindu temples in England.

References

External links
 Allhindutemples.com: Hindu Temples in the United-Kingdom

 01
United Kingdom
Hindu temples
Hinduism in the United Kingdom
Indian diaspora in the United Kingdom